Poolville is an unincorporated community in Parker County, Texas, United States located along Farm Road 920, about seventeen miles north of Weatherford, the county seat. It has a population of 2,325 and a school district with three campuses. Businesses include a seed company, a post office (ZIP Code 76487), a convenience store, a storage facility and 2L Custom Trucks.

There are five churches: Methodist, Southern Baptist, Church of Christ, The Lone Star Church of Poolville Texas, and Oak Tree Baptist Church. The United Methodist and the Church of Christ Church buildings are located just west of the town square behind the seed company.

February 22, 1996, an eight-month drought brought fires to Poolville, destroying hundreds to thousands of acres of land.

The rodeo announcer Bob Tallman operates a ranch near Poolville.

Orville Bullington, a Wichita Falls attorney and the 1932 Republican gubernatorial nominee against Miriam A. Ferguson, was raised in Poolville.

Climate
The climate in this area is characterized by relatively high temperatures and evenly distributed precipitation throughout the year. The Köppen Climate System describes the weather as humid subtropical, and uses the abbreviation Cfa.

Photo gallery

References

 Rodeo News: Bob Tallman
 3T Rodeo Ranch, Poolville-TX

External links
 

Unincorporated communities in Parker County, Texas
Unincorporated communities in Texas
Dallas–Fort Worth metroplex